Young Fine Gael (YFG) is the autonomous youth wing of Fine Gael,  one of Ireland’s major centre-right political parties. It offers its members scope to assist in formulation of political policy, and the day-to-day running of the senior party.  It is a founding member of the centre-right pan-European organisation, Youth of the European People's Party, also known as YEPP, which is the youth wing of the European People's Party.

YFG's constitution allows for the organisation to act on its own, independent from its parent party, enabling it to promote its own political objectives and take its own stance on political issues.

History 
Young Fine Gael was formed in 1977 as part of the internal reforms to Fine Gael instigated by Garret FitzGerald, who had become leader of the party that same year.  They grew rapidly with over 100 local branches of YFG being formed by 1978.  During the 1980s the organisation pursued a relatively socially liberal agenda, supporting the repeal of Ireland's homosexuality laws; a ban on the state funding on single-sex schools; and greater family planning options.

More recently in 2015, YFG campaigned in favour of legalising same-sex marriage by supporting the Thirty-fourth Amendment of the Constitution of Ireland. In 2017, YFG members at the organisation's Summer School voted to take a neutral stance on any upcoming referendum on Ireland's Eighth Amendment governing the country's abortion laws. In 2018, YFG members voted in favour of Ireland becoming a member of the European nuclear physics research centre; CERN.

In 2019, YFG established its first branch in Northern Ireland, with a branch launched at Queen's University Belfast. This launch of this branch was attended by the Attorney General, and Minister for European Affairs Helen McEntee. In 2020, YFG opposed the Programme for Government agreed by Fianna Fáil, Fine Gael and the Green Party in 2020. However, the Fine Gael party voted overwhelmingly in favour of entering coalition.

National campaigns
 Homeless Solidarity Campaign (2003 & 2004). Sleep-outs in Dublin, Cork and Limerick to raise awareness of Irelands' homelessness problem.
 Housing Tax Campaign (2004): Nationwide petition campaign to raise awareness of the government's excessive tax take on new homes for first-time buyers.
 Talk! Campaign (2005): To raise awareness of Mental Health and Suicide 
 Voter Registration Campaign (2006): To encourage Youth Participation in Politics
 Lisbon Treaty Campaign (2008): Campaign to seek a Yes vote in the Irish referendum on the Lisbon Treaty.
 Fair Fares Campaign (2014): A campaign to highlight the anomaly that students aged between 16–18 years of age pay an adult fare instead of a student fare. This campaign also called for the universal acceptance of school IDs as proof of identity. 
 Break the Ban Campaign (2014). A campaign that called for the repeal of the legislation that banned the sale of alcohol in pubs on Good Friday.
 Priorities for Young Ireland (2014). A policy document launch that summarises all YFG policy. This document was launched by the Taoiseach Enda Kenny in the Royal College of Surgeons on St. Stephen's Green in May.
 Exiting the Crisis, Preparing for the Future (2014). A policy document that contained 15 recommendations for Government regarding youth unemployment. This document was launched by Simon Harris.
 Positive Thinking, Positive Action (2014). A policy document that contained 12 recommendations for Government regarding Mental Health. This document was launched in Buswells Hotel by Senator Colm Burke.
Marriage Equality Referendum (2015). YFG campaigned in favour of a Yes vote in the Marriage Equality referendum in 2015.
UseYourOwn Campaign (2018). Campaign for introduction of a €0.25 Government levy on disposable coffee cups. 
 Know Your Past Campaign (2018). Campaign in favour of providing History as a compulsory Junior Cycle subject.
 Pay Our Troops (2018). A very large scale campaign which called on the Fine Gael-led government to restore the pay of members of the Irish Defence Forces to their pre-2008 Crash levels.
 Building An Inclusive Island (2019). This action-plan was launched by the Diversity and Inclusion Committee at an event attended by Kate O'Connell TD, MEP candidate Maria Walsh and others.
Mental Health Matters (2020). The campaign looked for assurance that an increase to mental health funding as per the Sláintecare plan despite the fiscal impacts of the COVID-19 pandemic.
Longer Nights and Cheaper Pints (2021). This campaign pushed for a reform of Irish licencing laws as well as a reduction in tax levied on alcoholic beverages sold in pubs and nightclubs.
 Safer Nights Campaign (2022). A campaign pushing for harsher punishments for needle spiking.

Organisation 
Young Fine Gael is formed from branches, gathered into regional structures, and with an overall National Executive. Officers at all levels work with the Fine Gael National Youth Officer, who works in Fine Gael headquarters.

Branches 
YFG is made up of two forms of branches: Constituency branches and College branches.  Constituency branches roughly follow each Dáil constituency, while college branches exist in most Irish higher education institutions. Branches provide a forum for students interested in areas of political discussion, policy, debate and social activities.

Regional Councils 
Young Fine Gael has Four Regional Councils based on Irish European Parliamentary constituencies. These Councils are chaired by their respective Regional Organisers elected to the National Executive.

National Executive 
The National Executive consist of ten officers.  As of 2023, the roles and their holders are the President (Eoghan Gallagher), Vice-President (Steven Murphy), four panel members (Béibhinn Byrne, Liam Coppinger, Daniel Lynch, Caolán Maguire) and four regional organisers (Jamie Malone, John Healy, Liam O Donovan, Sean Martyn).  The executive is elected at a National Conference, held every 16–22 months. The first panel member elected automatically becomes the national secretary (as of 2023, Liam Coppinger), and takes a seat on the National Executive of the Fine Gael party, alongside the YFG president and vice-president. The last National Conference took place at the Galway Bay Hotel, from the 24-26 of February 2023.

International Committee
Young Fine Gael's International Committee deals with all of YFG's international relations and foreign policy. It is also responsible for the development and maintenance of relationships with other youth political parties worldwide, particularly those in the European Union. YFG is a founding member of the Youth of the European People's Party (YEPP), the youth organisation of the European People's Party. YEPP is Europe's largest youth political organisation, bringing together 57 member organisations from 39 countries. Eileen Lynch, the Secretary General of YEPP, is a member of YFG, and formerly served as International Secretary. The current International Secretary is Paula Campbell.

Policy Committee
Young Fine Gael's Policy Committee issues annual pre-budget submissions to the senior Fine Gael (FG) party. The youth-wing is also responsible for establishing a manifesto on their proposals for youth affairs. The Policy Committee is currently co-chaired by the Director of Policy and Director of Campaigns as a joint committee. YFG's Policy Committee also submit proposals for inclusion on the Fine Gael’s General Election manifesto, and publish their own Youth Manifesto during elections campaigns.

Engagement, Diversity and Inclusion Committee
Young Fine Gael's Engagement, Diversity and Inclusion Committee is responsible for promoting equality, diversity and inclusion within the organisation. The previous Committee launched an Action Plan for Diversity and Inclusion, titled 'Building an Inclusive Island', in February 2019. The Committee is currently chaired by the Director of Engagement, Diversity and Inclusion Committee, Emily Larkin.

Controversies 
In 2008, independent TD Finian McGrath accused Young Fine Gael of being "cheap and sexist" after it published pro-Lisbon Treaty posters. The first depicted a scantily clad male model in a tight pair of EU boxer shorts with the words "Enlarge your opportunities" emblazoned across them. The second poster showed a young woman holding a pair of melons close to her chest with the slogan "Increase your prospects." Mr. McGrath said he considered the campaign ""tacky and childish" and accused YFG of attempting to degrade the seriousness of the debate.

In October 2015, president Padraig O'Sullivan resigned from his position “due to work and personal commitments”. It later transpired that his sudden departure was prompted by other members of the National Executive. An informed source, who declined to be named, told The Journal website that a petition, signed by the majority of executive council members, was hand-delivered to O’Sullivan’s home. The petition demanded that O’Sullivan either resign or he would be forced out. Interim president Colm Taylor, who was elected YFG vice president in March of that year, insisted it was an internal party matter, stating; "The situation is that Padraig did resign. It is an internal party matter. The executive of YFG are meeting on Tuesday to discuss matters arising from it. I won’t comment any further." 

In February 2016, a YFG member posted a meme of  Sinn Féin's Mary Lou McDonald, making fun of the fact she referred to 'Booby Sands' on a leaflet, online. McDonald described it as an example of "everyday sexism", "tasteleless" and "bordering on smutty". Also in 2016, a YFG member replied to a tweet by Sinn Féin councillor Sarah Holland, using the official YFG Twitter account. The reply contained the line 'where's that child I killed?''', a reference to the IRA. YFG later apologised for the incident, stating that the tweet had been sent by an individual within the organisation using the YFG account.

In 2018, following the election of YFG president Killian Foley-Walsh, The Journal'' wrote about a tweet sent by Mr Foley-Walsh in 2015 which argued against the use of abortion pills with reference to "coat hangers," which he later described as "an atrocious comment". This was followed by a profile piece in Phoenix Magazine describing Mr Foley-Walsh as "The baby-faced Blueshirt." In August 2019, there were calls for Foley-Walsh to resign when he and another member of the National Executive  attended the Young America Foundation's annual conference at which many prominent Republicans including the then VP Mike Pence and Ted Cruz spoke. Foley-Walsh also come under fire for his views expressed before being elected — including his apparent victim-blaming of those murdered by right-wing terrorist Anders Breivik, who killed 77 people in Oslo and Utoya in 2011. Neither individual resigned their post. In 2017, while serving as National Secretary and Director of Communications, Foley-Walsh came under fire for telling a homeless man to "quit whinging" and "surely you can find somewhere to live" while discussing homelessness.

In November 2021, the Kilkenny branch of YFG publicly called for the resignation of Tánaiste and party leader, Leo Varadkar, due to an ongoing Garda investigation into his leak of a confidential pay agreement document to his friend, a leader of a rival representative group to that involved in the negotiations; and low poll numbers under his leadership. The branch announced the following day that it had been "terminated" and its committee vacated by central Young Fine Gael. The controversy was described as "the straw that broke the camel’s back" by three of the ten-member National Executive, Gary O’Donovan, Dylan Hutchinson, Audrey O’Leary, who resigned in protest at the treatment of the Kilkenny branch, and because of a "toxic" atmosphere within the Executive.

References

External links 
 Young Fine Gael

 
Youth wings of conservative parties
Youth wings of political parties in Ireland